A commune (xã) is a type of third tier subdivision of Vietnam. It is divided into 11,162 units along with wards and townships, which have an equal status.

Communes have a lower status than provincial cities, towns or districts.

Facts

Certain small villages are not officially regarded as administrative communes.

As of December 31, 2008, Vietnam had 9,111 communes. Thanh Hoá Province contained the highest number of communes (586) amongst all province-level administrative units, followed by Nghệ An Province with 436 and Hanoi with 408. Đà Nẵng, with only 11 communes, contained the fewest. Counted together, the ten province-level administrative units containing the most communes—namely, Thanh Hoá (586), Nghệ An (436), Hanoi (408), Thái Bình (267), Phú Thọ (251), Hà Tĩnh (238), Hải Dương (234), Quảng Nam (210), Bắc Giang (207), and Lạng Sơn (207)—contain one-third of all the communes in Vietnam. Three of these are located in the Red River Delta region, three in the Đông Bắc (Northeast) region, three in the Bắc Trung Bộ (North Central Coast) region, and one in the Nam Trung Bộ (South Central Coast) region.

According to data extracted from General Statistics Office of Vietnam, there are 11,164 third-level (commune-level) administrative subdivisions. As of 2018 February, the number of third-level administrative subdivisions in Vietnam is 11,162.

History

In 1957, South Vietnamese President Ngo Dinh Diem launched a counter-insurgency project known as Strategic Hamlet Program, in order to isolate the rural Vietnamese from contact with and influence by the communist National Liberation Front (NLF). A number of "fortified villages", called "joint families", were created throughout South Vietnam, consisting of villages that had been consolidated and reshaped to create a defensible perimeter. The peasants themselves would be given weapons and trained in self-defense. Several problems—including corruption, unnecessary amounts of forced relocation, and poor execution—caused the program to backfire drastically, and ultimately led to a decrease in support for Diem's regime and an increase in sympathy for Communist efforts.

References

Subdivisions of Vietnam
Vietnam 3
Communes, Vietnam